Malleshwaram Assembly constituency is one of the assembly segment of Karnataka state. It is a part of Bengaluru Urban district and comes under  Bengaluru North parliamentary constituency.

Members of Legislative Assembly

Election results

References

External links
2018 election results
2018 election info

Assembly constituencies of Karnataka
Bangalore